The 1951 VFL Grand Final was an Australian rules football game contested between the Geelong Football Club and Essendon Football Club, held at the Melbourne Cricket Ground on 29 September 1951. It was the 54th annual Grand Final of the Victorian Football League, staged to determine the premiers for the 1951 VFL season.

The match

Geelong
The match, attended by 84,109 spectators, was won by Geelong by 11 points (the club's fourth premiership). The win by Geelong — its first since winning the 1937 VFL Grand Final — capped off a brilliant season; the team won the Minor Premiership, its back-pocket, Bernie Smith, won the Brownlow Medal, and its full-forward, George Goninon, was the league's leading goalkicker.

Essendon
Essendon went into the match without star full-forward John Coleman who had been suspended in controversial circumstances for four matches. On the day of the match, champion ruckman John Gill had a heavy cold and declared himself unfit to play. At the last minute, the Essendon coach, Dick Reynolds, who had retired the year before, was re-registered as a player; Fred Payne replaced Gill in the run-on team, and Reynolds became 19th Man.

Teams

Statistics

Score

Goalkickers

See also
 1951 VFL season

Footnotes

References
 AFL Tables: 1951 Grand Final (Archived 2009-09-24)
 1951 (Archived 2009-09-24)
 The Official statistical history of the AFL 2004 
 Ross, J. (ed), 100 Years of Australian Football 1897-1996: The Complete Story of the AFL, All the Big Stories, All the Great Pictures, All the Champions, Every AFL Season Reported, Viking, (Ringwood), 1996.

External links
 : Dick Reynolds is in Essendon guernsey no.3.

VFL/AFL Grand Finals
Grand
Geelong Football Club
Essendon Football Club
September 1951 sports events in Australia